The American films of 1959 are listed in a table of the films which were made in the United States and released in 1959.  The film Ben-Hur won the Academy Award for Best Picture, among winning a record-setting eleven Oscars.

A–B

C–D

E–H

I–N

O–S

T–Z

See also
 1959 in the United States

References

External links
 
1959 films at the Internet Movie Database

1959
Films
Lists of 1959 films by country or language